Reece McAlear (born 12 February 2002) is a Scottish professional footballer who plays as a midfielder for Scottish Championship club Ayr United, on loan from  club Tranmere Rovers.

Career
He joined Norwich City from Motherwell for an undisclosed fee in summer 2019.

He made his debut on 28 November 2020 as a substitute in a league match against Coventry City.

On 17 June 2021, McAlear joined Scottish Championship side Inverness Caledonian Thistle on a season-long loan deal.

On 21 May 2022, it was announced that McAlear would be released by Norwich City at the end of the season when his contract expired.

On 9 June 2022, it was announced that McAlear had signed for Tranmere Rovers on a two-year contract. On 31 January 2023, McAlear joined Scottish Championship club Ayr United on loan until the end of the season.

International career
McAlear has represented Scotland at youth international level.

References

2002 births
Living people
Scottish footballers
Footballers from Glasgow
Association football midfielders
Motherwell F.C. players
Norwich City F.C. players
Inverness Caledonian Thistle F.C. players
Tranmere Rovers F.C. players
English Football League players
Scottish Professional Football League players

Ayr United F.C. players